Evangelical Union may refer to:

 Evangelical Union (Scotland), a religious phenomenon in Scotland
 Protestant Union, a coalition of Protestant German states in the 17th century
 A union between Lutheran and Reformed Churches, e.g. Prussian Union
 A campus Christian group affiliated with Campus Crusade for Christ
 The Sydney University Evangelical Union, a University Christian group with the University of Sydney